FM Derana is Free-to-air Sinhala radio channel in Sri Lanka. Established in March 2009, FM Derana broadcasts 24 hours a day and it covers over 95% of the Island. Designed to appeal to a broad cross-section of listeners, FM Derana is leveraged on the strength and success of Derana TV, a strategic consolidation that will revolutionize the media landscape with its simple yet highly entertaining format.
Currently FM Derana holds the No 1 position among all radio channels in Sri Lanka.
The channel had maintained this No 1 position for the past three years in a row. FM Derana managed to achieve this No. 1 position in just 8 years from its inception. There are 37 channels currently operating in Sri Lanka of which 30 channels are in the Sinhala Language. There are little over 50 local channels in operation currently in Sri Lanka.

History 
FM Derana is a Sinhala language  FM radio channel launched on 29 March 2009 extending the promise of "Embracing novelty while upholding values" ("අපේ දේ රැකගෙන අලුත් දේ අරගෙන") to the Sri Lankan radio industry.

World Cup Cricket 2011 
FM Derana was the official Sri Lankan Radio Broadcaster  of 2011 Cricket World Cup which was held from 19 February 2011 to 2 April 2011.

Frequencies 
 92.2 & 92.4

Popular programmes on Fm Derana 
 Anupma
 Derana chart show
 Apinodanna Radio
 Chooti Malli Podi Malli
 Pirith
 Ada Derana News bulletin
 Apoorva
 FM Derana Attack show

See also
 List of 2011 Cricket World Cup broadcasting rights

References

External links
Official FM Derana website

Radio stations established in 2009
Sinhala-language radio stations in Sri Lanka
Power House
2009 establishments in Sri Lanka